Salvia mohavensis (Mojave sage) is a species of sage endemic to the Mojave Desert. It is a low rounded shrub growing to 1 m tall with small opposite evergreen leaves 1.5–2 cm long, which are dark green or may appear nearly gray due to a covering of fine white hairs. The 2 cm long flowers are pale blue with protruding stamens, and occur in headlike whorls that occur singly at the tip of the stem. It blooms from April to June.

References 

Jepson Flora Project: Salvia mohavensis
USDA Plant Profile for Salvia mohavensis

mohavensis
North American desert flora
Flora of the California desert regions
Plants described in 1854
Flora without expected TNC conservation status